Moayad Samir Ajan (born 16 February 1993 in Syria) is a Syrian footballer. He currently plays for East Riffa, who play in the Bahraini Premier League the top division in Syria.

International goals 
Scores and results table. Syria's goal tally first:

|}

Honours

Club
Al-Quwa Al-Jawiya
 Iraq FA Cup: 2015–16

Zamalek SC
Egypt Cup (1): 2017–18

International
 WAFF Championship: 2012

References

External links
 
 Profile Goal.com

1993 births
Living people
Syrian footballers
Syria international footballers
Syrian expatriate footballers
Expatriate footballers in Iraq
Syrian expatriate sportspeople in Iraq
Association football defenders
Sportspeople from Damascus
Zamalek SC players
2019 AFC Asian Cup players
Syrian Premier League players
Naft Al-Basra SC players
Expatriate footballers in Bahrain
Syrian expatriate sportspeople in Egypt
Expatriate footballers in Egypt
Egyptian Premier League players
Bahraini Premier League players
Riffa SC players
Al-Wahda SC (Syria) players
Al-Quwa Al-Jawiya players
Syrian expatriate sportspeople in Jordan
Expatriate footballers in Jordan
Al-Karkh SC players
Naft Al-Wasat SC players
Jordanian Pro League players